The Landesbank für Bosnien und Herzegowina was a bank established in Sarajevo in 1895 to help finance the development of Bosnia and Herzegovina under Austro-Hungarian rule. It kept operating after the establishment of the Kingdom of Yugoslavia and during World War II, but had ceased operations by 1954. 

Its former head office, initially built as a hotel, is a landmark of Sarajevo.

History

In 1895, the Wiener Bankverein led the creation of the Landesbank in Sarajevo, at the initiative of the Austro-Hungarian government authorities and in cooperation with the Hungarian Bank for Industry and Commerce. It soon established branches in Banja Luka, Bijeljina, Brčko, Mostar, and Tuzla. In 1907,  represented the Serbian community in the bank's board of directors.

The bank survived the turmoil of World War I and, while still under the control of the Wiener Bankverein, adapted to the new conditions in the newly created Kingdom of Yugoslavia. , who had been the Landesbank's deputy head since its creation, was appointed its president and general manager in 1919. Following the Anschluss in 1938, Deutsche Bank controlled the Wiener Bankverein and thus the Landesbank, which kept operating under Nazi occupation. The Landesbank was nationalized by the Yugoslav authorities by December 1946, together with all other banks in the country, and merged into the National Bank of Yugoslavia.

Building

In 1896, the bank moved into the building of the Grand Hotel, which had recently closed after only one year of operations. The building had been erected in 1893-1895 on a design by architects Karel Pařík and Josip Vancaš. It occupies a prominent location at the eastern end of Sarajevo's main thoroughfare, named Marshal Tito street since 1945. 

On , the Eternal Flame monument, a tribute to the Yugoslav Partisans designed by Juraj Neidhardt, was inaugurated at the front of the Landesbank building, replacing the former main entrance. The building later hosted various administrative services of the Ministry of Finance and Treasury of Bosnia and Herzegovina.

See also
 Zemská Banka
 Hotel Europe (Sarajevo)
 Landesbank

Notes

Defunct banks of Yugoslavia
Banks established in 1895
Legacy of Austria-Hungary